Manion may refer to:

 Daniel Anthony Manion (born 1942), United States federal judge for the United States Court of Appeals for the Seventh Circuit
 Ed Manion, American saxophone player
 Jack Manion (1877-1959), San Francisco Police Sergeant
 John Manion (born 1931), retired Canadian civil servant
 Robert James Manion (1881-1943), leader of the Conservative Party of Canada
 Manyam Zamindar of French Yanam.
 Clarence Manion, American conservative and Dean of Notre Dame.

See also
 Mannion
 James Mannon, American sociologist